The 2021 North Tyneside Metropolitan Borough Council election took place on 6 May 2021 to elect members of North Tyneside Metropolitan Borough Council in England. This was on the same day as the 2021 United Kingdom local elections. One third of the seats, one in each of the twenty three-member wards, were up for election, with three wards (Chirton, Preston and St Mary's) electing two councillors.

Results

Ward results

Battle Hill

Benton

Camperdown

Chirton

Collingwood

Cullercoats

Howdon

Killingworth

Longbenton

Monkseaton North

Monkseaton South

Northumberland

Preston

Riverside

St. Mary's

Tynemouth

Valley

Wallsend

Weetslade

Whitley Bay

By-elections

Camperdown

References 

North Tyneside
North Tyneside Council elections